Alois Kaňkovský (born 9 July 1983) is a Czech former professional cyclist, who rode professionally between 2006 and 2021 for the  and  teams. At the 2007 UCI Track Cycling World Championships, he became world champion in the omnium event and also won a bronze medal in the madison.

Major results
Source:

Track

2001
 UEC European Junior Track Championships
1st  Kilo
2nd  Team sprint
3rd  Points race
2003
 2nd  Kilo, UEC European Under-23 Track Championships
2004
 3rd  Kilo, 2004–05 UCI Track Cycling World Cup Classics, Moscow
2005
 UEC European Under-23 Track Championships
2nd  Kilo
3rd  Team sprint
 3rd  Kilo, 2005–06 UCI Track Cycling World Cup Classics, Moscow
2006
 3rd  Madison, UEC European Track Championships (with Petr Lazar)
2007
 UCI Track Cycling World Championships
1st  Omnium
3rd  Madison (with Petr Lazar)
 3rd Six Days of Turin (with Petr Lazar)
2009
 3rd Six Days of Fiorenzuola (with Petr Lazar)
2012
 2nd Six Days of Fiorenzuola (with Milan Kadlec)

Road

2010
 1st GP Hydraulika Mikolasek
 1st Central European Tour Gyomaendröd GP
 1st Stage 4 Czech Cycling Tour
2011
 2nd Overall Tour of Taihu Lake
1st Stages 2 & 4
2012
 International Azerbaïjan Tour
1st Stages 2 & 3
 Tour of Taihu Lake
1st  Points classification
1st Stages 2 & 8
 Tour of Fuzhou
1st  Points classification
1st Stage 1
2013
 1st  Overall Tour of China II
1st  Points classification
1st Stages 2, 3 & 4
 1st Tour of Nanjing
 Tour of Iran
1st  Points classification
1st Stages 2, 3 & 4
 1st Stage 3 Tour of China I
 2nd Overall Tour of Taihu Lake
1st Stages 5 & 7
2014
 2nd Overall Tour of Taihu Lake
1st Stage 2
 3rd Tour of Yancheng Coastal Wetlands
2015
 1st Memoriał Romana Siemińskiego
 Visegrad 4 Bicycle Race
1st GP Hungary
1st GP Slovakia
 1st Memoriał Henryka Łasaka
 1st Stage 3 Course de la Solidarité Olympique
 1st Stage 1 East Bohemia Tour
 4th Memoriał Andrzeja Trochanowskiego
2016
 1st Puchar Ministra Obrony Narodowej
 1st Memoriał Andrzeja Trochanowskiego
 1st Stage 2 Szlakiem Grodów Piastowskich
 2nd GP Slovakia, Visegrad 4 Bicycle Race
 5th Memorial Grundmanna I Wizowskiego
 6th Memoriał Romana Siemińskiego
2017
 1st  Overall Dookoła Mazowsza
1st Stages 1 & 4
 1st Puchar Ministra Obrony Narodowej
 1st Memoriał Romana Siemińskiego
 1st Memoriał Andrzeja Trochanowskiego
 1st GP Slovakia, Visegrad 4 Bicycle Race
 1st Stage 3 Course de Solidarność et des Champions Olympiques
 6th Trofej Umag
2018
 1st Memoriał Romana Siemińskiego
 1st Memoriał Andrzeja Trochanowskiego
 1st GP Czech Republic, Visegrad 4 Bicycle Race
 1st Stage 2 Tour du Loir-et-Cher
 1st Stage 2 Szlakiem Grodów Piastowskich
 1st Stage 2 Grand Prix Cycliste de Gemenc
 1st Stage 2 Okolo Jižních Čech
 2nd Overall Dookoła Mazowsza
1st Stage 3
 6th Croatia–Slovenia
2019
 1st Trofej Umag
 1st Memoriał Andrzeja Trochanowskiego
 1st Memoriał Romana Siemińskiego
 Visegrad 4 Bicycle Race
1st GP Polski
1st GP Slovakia
 1st Stage 3 Tour of Bihor
 1st Stage 3b Tour de Hongrie
 8th Overall À travers les Hauts-de-France
2020
 2nd GP Slovakia, Visegrad 4 Bicycle Race
 7th Trofej Umag
2021
 2nd GP Poland, Visegrad 4 Bicycle Race

References

External links

Czech male cyclists
1983 births
Living people
Cyclists at the 2004 Summer Olympics
Cyclists at the 2008 Summer Olympics
Olympic cyclists of the Czech Republic
People from Olomouc District
UCI Track Cycling World Champions (men)
Tour of Azerbaijan (Iran) winners
Czech track cyclists
European Games competitors for the Czech Republic
Cyclists at the 2015 European Games
Sportspeople from the Olomouc Region